Vangara Venkata Subbaiah, better known as Vangara, was an actor of Telugu cinema. He acted in more than 100 films and in some plays.

Early life
He was born in Sangam Jagarlamudi near Tenali. He started his acting career in 1901 in the play Chitranalineeyam at the age of four years. He has worked for sometime as teacher. He joined Rama Vilasa Sabha, Tenali and acted in many dramas portraying various roles. He toured India and abroad with Yadavalli Suryanarayana.

Filmography
 Balayogini (1936)
 Mala Pilla (1938)
 Raithu Bidda (1939)
 Palnati Yuddham (1947) as Subbanna
 Mana Desam (1949)
 Raksha Rekha (1949)
 Shavukaru (1950)
 Malliswari (1951)
 Dharma Devatha (1952) as Duvva
Vayyari Bhama (1953)
 Bangaru Papa (1954)
 Chakrapani (1954)
 Peddamanushulu (1954)
 Donga Ramudu (1955) as School teacher
 Jayasimha (1955)
 Kanyasulkam (1955) as Karataka Sastri
Bangaru Papa (1955)
Santosham (1955)
 Tenali Ramakrishna (1956)
Sonta Ooru (1956)
Uma Sundari (1956)
 Edi Nijam (1956) as Poojari
Sri Gauri Mahatyam (1956)
 Mayabazar (1957) as Sastri
Kutumba Gowravam (1957)
 Panduranga Mahatyam (1957)
 Chenchu Lakshmi (1958) as Chandamarkula
 Mangalya Balam (1958)
Sri Krishna Maya (1958)
Daiva Balam (1959)
Sri Venkateswara Mahatyam (1960)
 Raja Makutam (1960)
 Mahakavi Kalidasu (1960)
Kadeddulu Ekaram Nela (1960)
Jagadekaveeruni Katha (1961) as Paata Manthri
Intiki Deepam Illale (1961)
Bhakta Jayadeva (1961)
Batasari (1961)
Manchi Manasulu (1962)
 Bhishma (1962)
Savathi Koduku (1963)
 Narthanasala (1963)
 Tirupathamma Katha (1963)
 Babruvahana (1964)
Vaarasatwam (1964)
Vivaha Bandham (1964)
Sri Krishna Pandaveeyam (1966)
 Paramanandayya Sishyula Katha (1966) as Parabrahma Sastry
Sati Sumathi (1967)
Govula Gopanna (1968)
Vichitra Kutumbam (1969) as Lawyer Padmanabha Sastry
 Ekaveera (1969)

References

External links
 

Male actors in Telugu cinema
Indian male film actors
1897 births
Year of death missing
20th-century Indian male actors
Indian male stage actors